The Committee for the Economy is a Northern Ireland Assembly committee established to advise, assist and scrutinise the work of the Department for the Economy and Minister for the Economy. The committee also plays a key role in the consultation, consideration and development of new legislation.

Until 2016, the committee was called the Committee for Enterprise, Trade and Investment.

Membership

See also 
 Committee

References

External links 
 Committee for Enterprise, Trade and Investment

Northern Ireland Assembly